Xiaomi Mi 2A (often referred to as Xiaomi Phone 2A), is a high-end, Android smartphone produced by Xiaomi Tech. The device features a dual-core 1.7 GHz Qualcomm Snapdragon S4 Pro as its CPU. The device was initially sold in China for ¥1499.

Specifications

Hardware
The casing of the Xiaomi Mi 2A is mostly made from plastic, with SIM card slots located inside. The microUSB port is located at the bottom of the device with the audio jack located at the top of the device. The power and volume keys were located on the right side of device. Near the top of the device are a front-facing camera, proximity sensors, and a notification LED. In particular, the proximity sensors are mostly used to detect whether the device is in a pocket or not. The device is widely available in white, green, yellow, blue, red and pink color finishes. The device's display is larger than its predecessor, with a 4.5-inch, 720p IPS LCD capacitive touchscreen  with a resolution of 326ppi, and Dragontrail glass.

The model is one of two variations of the Xiaomi Mi 2 Xiaomi created before creating the Xiaomi Mi 3. The device comes with 16GB of internal storage and a 2030mAh, NFC-enabled battery.

Software

The Xiaomi Mi2A ships with Android and Xiaomi's MIUI user experience.

Updates
Updates for the Xiaomi Mi 2A is available in three channels: stable, developer and daily. New stable builds are usually available every month with major changes between each update, new developer builds are usually available every week with small but sometimes significant features added between each update and new beta builds are usually available every Wednesdays and usually only contain small fixes and optimizations. Beta builds are only available to some beta testers selected on MIUI's community forums. To update between versions, users usually use an over-the-air updater application.

See also 
 Xiaomi
 MIUI
 Comparison of smartphones

References

External links

Xiaomi Case

Mi 2A
Android (operating system) devices
Mobile phones introduced in 2013
Discontinued smartphones
Mobile phones with user-replaceable battery